The 2011 DFL-Supercup was the second DFL-Supercup, an annual football match contested by the winners of the previous season's Bundesliga and DFB-Pokal competitions. It was a Revierderby between 2010–11 Bundesliga winners Borussia Dortmund, and 2010–11 DFB-Pokal winners Schalke 04. The match was played at Gelsenkirchen on 23 July 2011.

Schalke 04 prevailed on penalties, following a scoreless match after 90 minutes. There was no extra time played.

Teams
In the following table, matches until 1996 were in the DFB-Supercup era, since 2010 were in the DFL-Supercup era.

Match

Details

References

2011
FC Schalke 04 matches
Borussia Dortmund matches
2011–12 in German football cups
DFL-Supercup 2011